Kabinda is the capital city of Lomami Province in the Democratic Republic of the Congo.  Projected to be the second fastest growing African continent city between 2020 and 2025, with a 6.37% growth.

Geography 
Kabinda is served by Tunta Airport. The town had 192,364 inhabitants 2010. The city is part of the Roman Catholic Diocese of Kabinda.

Second Congo War 
During the Second Congo War Kabinda was devastated by fighting between Congolese forces and Rwandan rebels, who were advancing west on their way to the diamond producing area around Mbuji-Mayi. The town was surrounded and besieged by the Rwandans for two years, however it remained under government control.

References

 
Populated places in Lomami